Skršín is a municipality and village in Most District in the Ústí nad Labem Region of the Czech Republic. It has about 300 inhabitants.

Administrative parts
Villages of Chrámce and Dobrčice are administrative parts of Skršín.

References

Villages in Most District